Apharan is a 2018 Indian Hindi-language action thriller streaming television series directed and co-produced by Sidharth Sengupta for video on demand platform ALTBalaji. The series stars Arunoday Singh. The series is set in current times and revolves around kidnapping, suspense, mystery and never ending action.

The series is available for streaming on the ALT Balaji App and its associated websites since its release date. Season 2 was released on  18 March 2022.

Plot 
Rudra Srivastava (Arunoday Singh), a senior inspector of Uttarakhand Police is lured into kidnapping a young girl named Anusha (Monica Chaudhary), at her step-mother (Mahie Gill)'s request. The plot begins as a simple plan to extort money in exchange for Anusha.
This series revolves around crime, thriller, mystery, and suspense with action and comedy sequences.

Apharan is based on the 70s era with the feeling of nostalgia and great suspense and mystery. The story follows a cop 'Rudra' who was falsely accused and ends up in jail for 3 years. The plot is all about the mystery of the murder of a kidnapped girl.

Season 2 revolves around Rudra navigating his professional duties with his personal life at stake. To find a cure for his wife's addiction, the RAW sends the formidable cop to Serbia to track down and capture Bikram Bahadur Singh, or BBS, a wanted criminal responsible for the death of 9 Indian RAW agents in one month.

Cast
 Arunoday Singh as Rudra Srivastava/Bikram Bahadur Shah (BBS) Dual Role in season 2
 Mahie Gill as Madhu Tyagi/Malini 
 Ujjawal Chopra as Bhandari Season 2
 Monica Chaudhary as Anusha Tyagi season 1
 Nidhi Singh as Ranjana Srivastava
 Varun Badola as Laxman Saxena 
Saanand Verma as Satyanarayan Dubey
Neha Kaul as Madhu Tyagi
Pawan Chopra as Commissioner
 Ram Sujan Singh as Mishra
 Surender Singh as Constable Joshi
Sanjay Batra as Govind Tyagi
Nilesh Mamgain as Shukla
 Snehil Dixit Mehra as Sadhu's Wife
 Shweta Rajput as Ria-the Bride (Anusha's Friend)
 Nishant Tanwar as Inspector Bhatnagar
 Aditya Jadhav as Crying Child

Awards

References

External links
 Apharan at ALTBalaji

2018 web series debuts
Hindi-language web series
ALTBalaji original programming
Indian drama web series